Regardt van den Bergh is a South African film and television actor, film director, screenwriter and film producer .

Recognition
Regardt received the Ischia Global Award at the 7th Annual Ischia Global Film & Music Festival, Ischia, Italy, on 12 July 2009.

Partial filmography

References

External links
 Official website
 

South African male film actors
Afrikaner people
South African people of Dutch descent
South African film directors
South African film producers
South African screenwriters
South African male television actors
Living people
Year of birth missing (living people)